Ban of Benoic  (Old French: Ban de Bénoïc) is a character in Arthurian legend. King Ban first appeared by this name in the Lancelot propre part of the 13th-century French Vulgate Cycle as the ruler of the realm in France named  (Bénoïc; alternatively Benewic, Benoich, Benoit, Benuic, Benwick) and father of Sir Lancelot and Sir Hector de Maris, as well as brother of King Bors. Ban of Benoic largely corresponds to the other versions of the father of Lancelot, including Pant of Gen[n]ewis in the German Lanzelet, Haud of Schuwake in the English Sir Lancelot du Lake, and Domolot of Lokva in the Belarusian .

Role in Arthurian romances
Ban's kingdom of Benoic, the capital of which is Trebe (Trèbe), is located at the border between Armorican Brittany and Gaul. With his wife Queen Elaine (Élaine, a sister of King Bors' wife Evaine), King Ban begets the future great knight Lancelot (birth name Galahad, Galaad). Earlier, he sleeps with the Lady de Maris (Dame des Mares), who becomes illegitimately pregnant with Hector de Maris (Hector des Mares), Lancelot's half-brother and later one of his closest companions and followers. 

King Ban is first shown campaigning in the insular Britain in support of the young King Arthur. His castle is located in the middle of a marsh reputed to be impregnable, but the neighboring lord, King Claudas of the Wasteland, manages to set it on fire. Ban alone manages to escape along with his wife and their son but, overwhelmed by the disaster, promptly dies of grief. At this moment, the infant Lancelot is taken by the Lady of the Lake to her abode, where he is later joined by the now also dead Bors the Elder's sons Lionel and Bors the Younger. When the children grow up and become Knights of the Round Table, they aid Arthur in finally defeating Claudas and reclaiming their fathers' land. The war between King Ban and Claudas may symbolize the early medieval struggle of the Bretons against the invading Franks.

Origin in Welsh myth
According to Roger Sherman Loomis, "Ban is usually called Ban of Benoic, easily accounted for as a misunderstanding of Bran le Benoit, an exact translation of the Welsh Bendigeid Bran, or 'Bran the Blessed'." That is, the Vulgate author has misread and misconstrued the Old French benoit (='blessed') to be the name of a non-existent realm Benoic - of which he deduces King B(r)an to have been the ruler. The name Ban de Benoic / Benewic is also found in mutated form as Pant von Genewis (scribal error where initial 'B' misread as 'G') in another early Arthurian text treating of the hero Lancelot, namely the Lanzelet of Ulrich von Zatzikhoven.

As professors Loomis and Helaine Newstead have demonstrated, there is a tendency for individual figures from Celtic mythology to yield multiple characters in Arthurian romances and this process is apparent in the number of Arthurian characters whose names and/or attributes can be traced back to the gigantic king (see also Fisher King) and probable deity, Brân, whose exploits are recounted in Branwen ferch Llŷr (see also Llŷr), the second of the Four Branches of the Mabinogi. Newstead wrote: "The evidence concerning Ban, though it survives in obscure and refractory forms, nevertheless preserves connections with Baudemaguz, Brangor, Bron and Corbenic."

Loomis believed one of the authors of the Vulgate Lancelot to have preserved the memory of two figures from Welsh myth through their relation to Welsh toponyms: if it be accepted that the character of King Ban is indeed derived (as noted above) from Brân the Blessed, it follows that the Kingdom of King Ban is to be equated with the 'Land of Brân', which in Welsh designates the northeast of Wales. Abutting on the 'Land of Brân' was the 'Retreat of Gwri' (now known as the Wirral peninsula). Loomis suggested that the name Bohours de Gannes given to the brother of King Ban / Brân in the Vulgate text is part scribal error ('Bohours' for an original, 'Gwri'-derived 'Gohours') and part geographical rationalization (substitution of 'Gannes' for 'Galles', i.e. of 'Gaul' for 'Wales').

In modern culture
Ban is depicted as the "Fox Sin of Greed", as well as the member of the titular group of knights, in Nakaba Suzuki's manga The Seven Deadly Sins and in its anime adaptation. In the series, Ban is depicted as tall, with spiky white hair and a very youthful appearance, due to having drunk from the Fountain of Youth. He eventually has a child named Lancelot at the end of the series.

References

Works cited

Arthurian characters
Mythological kings